David Mercer (born 16 April 1961 in Salford, United Kingdom) is a weightlifter from  Great Britain.

He competed for Great Britain in the 1984 Summer Olympics held in Los Angeles, United States in the Middle-heavyweight (90 kg) event where (in the absence of the boycotting Soviet nations) he finished in third place.  Four years later he competed at the 1988 Summer Olympics in Seoul but was unable to win a second medal, finishing in sixth place.

References
Sports-reference

1961 births
English male weightlifters
Olympic weightlifters of Great Britain
Olympic bronze medallists for Great Britain
Weightlifters at the 1984 Summer Olympics
Weightlifters at the 1988 Summer Olympics
Living people
Olympic medalists in weightlifting
Medalists at the 1984 Summer Olympics
Commonwealth Games medallists in weightlifting
Commonwealth Games silver medallists for England
Weightlifters at the 1986 Commonwealth Games
20th-century English people
Medallists at the 1986 Commonwealth Games